MovieStarPlanet is a free-to-play online social game developed by MovieStarPlanet ApS for Windows, iOS, and Android. It was initially released in Denmark in 2009, before expanding to other countries. Players can dress up their characters, chat and play mini-games.

Gameplay 

In MovieStarPlanet, the players take over the role of a movie star avatar, which can be customized in various ways by buying clothes or room decorations. The avatars can meet each other in the game world, and then chat publicly or privately. When a user logs in, they are introduced with a spinning wheel that can be spun daily, with the user being able to receive different amounts of "StarCoins". The main premise of the game is to gain experience points called Fame, which is then used so users can level up.

The main microtransactions consist of the games ''VIP'' membership. The VIP membership has 3 tiers: "VIP", "Elite VIP" and "Star VIP". A VIP membership purchase also includes StarCoins and diamonds, with each tier including more than the previous one. The different tiers also differ in the maximum amount of friends able to get, the number of extra spins on the StarCoins wheel and more. Each tier can be purchased for a week, a month, 3 months or a year. The game has spending limits, meaning the players can only spend some amount of money within a certain time frame. VIP memberships can also be received for free by winning the weekly competition.

History 
In 2007, Claus Lykke Jensen and his partner, who were at the time students from the University of Copenhagen, envisioned the initial idea for MovieStarPlanet. They signed up for an e-learning development pool project from the Ministry of Science. The goal was to develop a game that could improve children's English language skills. After two years of e-learning, the commitment condition for a grant was fulfilled, and the work on the game started. The same year, when his partner left the project before the business took off, Jensen became the sole founder of the development company. The game launched in May 2009, and was originally mainly focused on the animations players could create. It launched exclusively in Denmark, but has since grown to be available in 16 countries in Europe, North America, and Oceania. The game was designed with children aged 8–15 in mind.

By 2013, the game had over 100 million registered users.

At the 11th European Conference on Game-Based Learning, it was reported that MovieStarPlanet was, in 2014, the most popular game amongst 9–12-year-old girls in Norway.

Merchandise 
In 2012, it was announced that MovieStarPlanet would be cooperating with the publishing company Egmont to create a MovieStarPlanet Magazine. Each issue of the magazine comes with a code players can redeem in the game to then receive digital cosmetics, such as ''StarCoins'', the currency used in the game, or clothing items for the users' character. The magazines contents includes fashion tips for the users, comics, competitions readers can participate in and more. In August 2021, the 100th issue of the Polish version of the magazine was released.

In 2021, MovieStarPlanet partnered with Panini to create a trading card collection in Poland. The cards consisted of 220 different designs, split into six different categories.

Reception 
Leslie Crenna from Common Sense Media has rated the website as suitable for users who are 16 or older, and has stated that the "content and privacy issues raise way too many red flags for even savvy Internet users", while Online Safety UK has rated it as suitable for kids who are 9 or over, with "added caution from parents". Dana Anderson from Common Sense Media, reviewing the mobile version of the game, also rated it suitable for people aged 16 or older, stating "this app is too simplistic for teens' meaningful use, and the content is not appropriate for younger kids", along with stating that it "also reinforces messages about consumerism and appearance that parents may not want to reinforce."

The game won an award for innovation and creativity at EY Entrepreneur of the Year 2014.

Safety 
MovieStarPlanet has stated that they are cautious of kids' online safety, and has been certified by COPPA's kidSAFE Program. Their head of safety, Vernon Jones, attended the Global Digital Citizenship Conference in 2013 at Melbourne. However, many articles have reported instances of grooming and underage users having received inappropriate/sexually explicit messages on the game.

Sequel 
A sequel, MovieStarPlanet 2, was announced on October 25, 2019.

References 

Browser games
2009 video games
Video games developed in Denmark
Social simulation video games
Virtual world communities